Ripidius is a genus of beetles belonging to the family Ripiphoridae.

The species of this genus are found in Europe and Northern America.

Species:
 Rhipidius longicollis Schilder, 1923 
 Rhipidius mexicanus Zaragoza-Caballero, 1983

References

Ripiphoridae
Tenebrionoidea genera